Korea University (KU) is a private research university in Seoul, South Korea, established in 1905. The university is included as one of the SKY Universities, a popular acronym referring to Korea's three most prestigious universities.

The student body consists of over 20,000 undergraduate students and over 10,000 graduate students. The university has 81 departments in 19 colleges and divisions, as well as 18 graduate schools. It has over 1,500 full-time faculty members with over 95% of them holding Ph.D. or equivalent qualification in their field. The Korea University Alumni Association consists of more than 280,000 university graduates.

Korea University is a large research institution, notable in South Korean history for being the first educational institution to offer academic programs in Korea in various disciplines, such as law, economics and journalism. It is particularly well known for its College of Law. Korea University also has auxiliary educational facilities such as the Institute of Foreign Language Studies, the Institute for Continuing Education, the Institute of International Education and the Center for Teaching and Learning. There are 115 research institutes, including the Battelle@KU Laboratory, the Ilmin International Relations Institute and the Center for Information Security Technologies.

History

Bosung College
Korea University was established on May 5, 1905, as Bosung College by Lee Yong-Ik, Treasurer of the Royal Household. The first College President was Hae-Uoung Shin. As an academic institution of nationalistic origin, it was regarded as a symbol of national pride during the colonial period (1910–1945).

Shortly after Bosung College was established, the "Korea–Japan Protocol" was signed, and Lee Yong-Ik went into exile to lead the resistance movement against Japan. His exile created financial hardship for the institution. The financial crisis was overcome when Sohn Byong-Hee, a leader of Chundokyo, a nationalist, religious and political movement at the time, took over the management of the institution.

By 1929, the institution once again faced a serious financial crisis as a result of the worldwide recession. This was alleviated when Kim Seong-su became the president of the college in 1932. At that time, Kim was managing Choong-Ang High School and the Dong-A Ilbo, a daily newspaper.

Relocation
In 1934, the main building was completed on a 63,000-pyeong area of land located in Anam-dong. Construction of the library started in 1935 to commemorate the thirtieth anniversary of the founding of Bosung College, and was completed two years later. In July of the following year, a large athletic field, was added to the campus. In April 1944, the Japanese colonial government forced Bosung College to change its name and placed it under the supervision of the Japanese authorities.

Modern Era
Following independence in 1945, the status of Bosung College was elevated to that of a university comprising three colleges, Political Science and Law, Economics and Commerce, and Liberal Arts. Hyun Sang-Yun, the first president, initiated an expansion of the campus by purchasing forest and land. In June 1949, Korea University awarded its first bachelor's degrees and in September of the same year, the graduate school was established. Yu Chin-O, the fourth president, continued to expand Korea University with the establishment of the Division of Science within the college of Liberal Arts, as well as a fourth college, the college of Agriculture.

In June 1961 the present Liberal Arts building (Seokwan) was completed. Various facilities were also completed such as the museum, the agriculture laboratory, the greenhouse, and other buildings for student services. In the same year, an experimental farm of about 1,680,000 pyeong was added to the facilities. In addition, the Science and Engineering Departments were equipped with laboratories and instruments. In December 1963, the Graduate School of Business Administration, the first of its kind in Korea, was established. In October 1965, Yu Chin-O retired after fifteen years of service as the fourth president of Korea University and was succeeded by Lee Chong-Woo as the fifth president. After 1966, Korea University continued to expand with a gradual increase in the number of departments within the College of Science and Engineering and in the College of Agriculture. The Graduate School of Education was also founded. More facilities, including the new annex buildings, the General Education Building (Kyoyangkwan), and the Mass Communication Building (Hongbokwan), were added.

In October 1970, Kim Sang-Hyup, professor of political science, was appointed as the sixth president, succeeding Lee Chong-Woo who retired in September of that year. In December 1971, a major reorganization of Korea University took place: all Woosuk University colleges, including Medicine, Liberal Arts and Sciences, Law and Economics, Junior College of Allied Health Sciences, as well as Woosuk University Hospital, were completely integrated into Korea University. In June 1972, the Business Administration Building (Kyoyangkwan) was completed to accommodate the College of Commerce and the Graduate School of Business Administration. In December of the same year, the college of Education was established.

In April 1975, President Kim Sang-Hyup was succeeded by Cha Rak-Hoon who became the seventh president. In December 1976, the College of Commerce was renamed the College of Business Administration. The Graduate School of Food and Agriculture was established in January of the following year. In December 1977, the College of Science and Engineering were separated into the College of Science and the College of Engineering. In addition, the new Central Library, the largest of its kind in South Korea at that time, was opened in March 1978. In July 1983, Medical School and hospital were expanded and reorganized into the Korea University Medical Center, which then included four new hospitals: Haewha, Guro, Yeoju and Ansan. In September 1983, the Science Library opened as the center for science and technology research and was at that time the largest and most modern building on the campus.

In June 2001, Korea University concluded a joint academic program with the University of British Columbia in Canada. The Korea University Lyceum was completed and SK Telecom made a significant contribution in the same month. In July, the Division of International Studies and the School of Journalism and Mass Communication were founded. In October, Korea University obtained ISO9001 authentication in all educational and administrative areas.

100th Anniversary
In 2005, Korea University celebrated its Centennial Anniversary of Foundation Day, May 5.

In March the College of Life Sciences and Biotechnology and the College of Life and Environmental Sciences were integrated into the College of Life Sciences and Biotechnology. At the same time, the Junior College of Health Sciences was abolished and merged into the new highly developed College of Health Sciences.

Currently, Korea University is composed of sixteen colleges and divisions, as well as eighteen graduate schools and eleven auxiliary facilities, including libraries, a museum, and a press office for public relations.

Academics

Colleges and schools
Korea University's 59 academic departments and programs are organized into 17 colleges and schools:

Departments and Programs

Interdisciplinary Programs

Admissions Selectivity
Admissions decisions are based on the applicants' high school transcripts and scores on the South Korean College Scholastic Ability Test. For the freshman class entering in 2016, the overall admission rate was 5.13%.

Rankings and Reputation

In 2021, the university was ranked 69th in the world. In 2016–17, the university was ranked 16th in Asia by QS World University Rankings. Also, in the 2014 QS World University Subject Rankings, the university's politics program, economics program, chemical engineering program and the communications program were all ranked within the top 50 in the world.

In 2003, Korea University Law School students accounted for more than 15% of the nearly 900 people who passed the annual Korean bar examination.

The business programs at Korea University obtained international certification by acquiring Association to Advance Collegiate Schools of Business (AACSB) certifications in both undergraduate and graduate levels and European Quality Improvement System (EQUIS) for the first time in South Korea, qualifying for two highly regarded certifications for business educational assessment. Accordingly, in 2007, the Ministry of Education, after assessing domestic MBA programs, named Korea University as having the MBA program in South Korea. In the 2015 Financial Times' EMBA Rankings, Korea University Business School's Executive MBA (E-MBA) program was ranked 27th in the world.

From 2003 to 2006, Euh Yoon-Dae, the current Chairman of President's Council on National Branding, Steering Committee of Korea Investment Corporation (KIC), and the former (15th) President of Korea University, drastically changed the image of Korea University, a change symbolized by the adoption of red wine over the traditional rice wine. He doubled the publication requirements required for faculty promotion and raised the ratio of the classes taught in English to 35% of all courses taught. He also required that core liberal arts classes are taught by full-time faculty and required every student except those in the Colleges of Engineering, Law, and Medicine to do a double major. He also signed academic exchange agreements with 172 universities overseas, and dispatched 60% of administration staff to the world's top 100 universities for training. Korea University also expanded its international-level facilities. It built the Centennial Memorial Samsung Hall, Hwajung Gymnasium, Tiger Plaza, and Hana Square, and also expanded educational and cultural spaces.

International Students
The overall number of international students about 4,000. Korea University offers English degree programs in the College of International Studies (CIS) and Graduate School of International Studies (GSIS). International students can also apply toward other degree programs through the Office of International Affairs. However, the language of instruction is usually Korean.

Research Institutes

 Battelle@KU Laboratory
 Center for Information Security Technologies
 IBS Center for Molecular Spectroscopy and Dynamics - Cho Minhaeng, Choi Wonshik
 Ilmin International Relations Institute
 Institute of Biotechnology
 Korean Language and Culture Center
 Research Institute for Information and Communication Technology
 Research Institute of Korean Studies

Campus

Seoul campus is divided into four subdivisions; Science and Engineering, Humanities and Social Sciences, Medicine and Life Sciences, and Jeongneung. It is located in the greater Seoul area that boasts a population of over 20 million. Within a five-minute walk from the campus are an array of restaurants, bars, shops, and even a famous Buddhist temple. It takes about 20 minutes from some buildings of main campus to some buildings of science or medical campus on foot.

 Library System
 University Museum - The first university museum in Korea, the museum contains over 100,000 pieces of data covering history, the study of antiquities, ethnology, and the arts.
 Centennial Memorial Samsung Hall - Completed in commemoration of KU's centennial, the building houses both a digital library and a number of national treasure-level cultural properties.
 LG-POSCO Hall - A new building for the Business School completed on a site of 14,122 m2 with funds of KRW 25 billion donated by companies and schoolfellows.
 Lyceum
 Central Square
 Hana Square
 CJ International House - A dormitory for visiting scholars and foreign professors and exchange students.
 Tiger Dome - A multi-purpose sports complex of 18,182 m2, the gym was completed in 2006. With three floors above the ground and another three below.
 Dongwon Hall
 Korean Studies Hall - Established to teach the Korean language and promote Korean culture.
 Chungsan-MK Culture Center - 6-story building opened in 2007 to encourage cultural exchanges between Korea and Japan and promote Japanese studies.
 Ice Rink - Containing an Olympic-sized skating rink and the finest in facilities, the Ice Rink also functions as a training base for national athletes.
 Media Hall - Building for students of the School of Media & Communication. Completed in August 2011 on a site of 11,663  m2. Contains various media facilities and studios that enable students to create media outputs.
 International Center for Converging Technology - Built in August 2008 with a total floor area of 7,665  m2. Scientific technology research activities are supported by various facilities and equipment.
 Green tract of land sports field - Established to play soccer or teach physical education.

Student Activities

Clubs
 Social Science: Philosophy village, The Wagon Wheel, Saram Saneun Saesang, Study Group of Culture, Working People, KUCC, Economics Institute of Current Events, UNSA (UN Student's Association), Korean Modern History Research Association, Current Affairs & Economy Society, Korean Society Research Association, Korean Spirit Training, B&B
 Exhibition and Creative Art: Institute of Arts Criticism, Our Literature Research Institute, KU Literature Association, Institute of Korean Painting Dolbit (KU Movie Critique Club), Geurim Madang (KU Cartoon Club), Keul mal literature Institute (KU poet's society), Hoyounghoi Jinbo Creative Literature Club, Seowha PAPCON
 Social Studies: One, Two, Five (a campaign for the disabled), Red Cross Student's Association Rotarect (university federation public service club), Nadal Moeum (an agricultural club)  Howoo Hwe (KU public service club), Eunwhawhe (a student association for night studies), Saebyok Kwangjang (a club for preserving the environment), KUSA
 Art: Korea University Choir (former KU Glee Club), KU Nongak (Korean instrumental music of peasants), KU Orchestra We love Tal (Korean Traditional Mask), KU Wind Ensemble Noraeol Theater, Korean Classical Music Classic Guitar Club, Crimson, Korea University A cappella Group LoGS, KUDT (Korea University Dance Team), Geurootogi (an Acoustic Guitar Club), TTP, Bulas (Sports Dance), TERRA (hip hop)
 Religion: Won-Buddhism Student's Association, Every Nation Mission (ENM), Jeung San Do, Student Christian Association, Campus Crusade for Christ (CCC), Korean Christian Students' Union, Christ's Ambassador Mission (CAM) University Mission, Buddhist Student's Association, Joy Mission, Catholic Student's Association, Student For Christ (SFC), IVF
 Language Studies: Nid d'amis (French Club), Dongsuchoi, KU Research Institute on Korean and Japanese Culture, S.I. S TIME, KU China Research Institute, E.C.S (English Conversation Researching Society), LECA (English Conversation Club), A.L.C
 Life Culture: Leisure and recreation Research Association, Youth Hostel (Travelling Club), Ho-Jin Hwe (theatre appreciation and critique club), Scout / Ho-Dong Hwe (a club made by Japanese Koreans), Paduk Sarang Meeting (a club for people who play Korean checkers)
 Sports: Fencing Club, Amateur Soccer team, Skin Scuba Diving, Korea University Amateur Baseball Club, KU Archery Club, Swimming Tiger's Club, Badminton / Ping-pong Club, Soobakdo
 Literary Art: Norae Madang, Talpae Hanaldarae, KU Folk Music Band, Yeol Gu Rim, ICCUS, TERRA, Sun Hyang Jae, Darkroom
 Science and Technology: KULS, KUERA, Amateur Astronomer's Club (KUAAA), Amateur Radio Association (HAM), Intelligent Robot Club (KAsimov)
 Others: Honong-hoe, The Morning Dew, Breaking The Cell, Buddhist Student Society, Sunlight Village, Youth & Future, Korea University Extreme Sports Club (KESC)

Traditions
 The Granite Tower Festival (Seoktap Daedongje) is an annual week of festivities usually held in May. Many celebrities are invited to perform throughout the week (around four celebrity performers every night) in the Minju-Gwangjang (민주광장) in front of Woodang Hall. The final day of celebration is called Ipselenti.
 April 18 Marathon (418 민주대장정) is a marathon honoring the students who were assaulted in the "April 18th Korea University student assault incident." 3,000 Korea University students gathered on April 18, 1960, in a peaceful demonstration against the rigged presidential election of Syngman Rhee on March 15, demanding rightful democracy. The government mobilized organized gangster groups to forcefully shut down this demonstration, injuring and incarcerating many. Korea University students take great pride in being one of the most active participants in Korean modern history, and the April 18 Marathon is one of the ways in which they honor their seniors who strived for a better future.
 Ipselenti- Cry of "Ji Ya" (입실렌티- 지.야의 함성) is a cheering festival that is held by the Korea University Cheerleaders on the last and biggest night of Seoktap Daedongje (Granite Tower University Festival). Students gather in the Nokji Field (녹지운동장) and sing Korea University's cheering songs, dance along and enjoy. Some of the country's best-known singers are also invited to perform there; Blackpink, Twice, Psy, Be-Why, AKMU, Red Velvet, 2NE1 being some of them. "Ipselenti" is part of Korea University's slogan that is used since Bosung College, and "Ji" and "Ya" means jiseong and yaseong (wisdom and wildness).
 Yonsei-Korea Friendship Games (see Athletics)

Athletics
Korea University is a member of the Korea University Sports Federation (KUSF) and its men's football/soccer, men's basketball, baseball and men's ice hockey teams participate in the KUSF U-League. It has a historic athletic rivalry with the nearby Yonsei University which dates back to the Japanese occupation era. Outside KUSF-sanctioned competitions, both institutions also compete in an annual "friendship games" across two days each fall in five team sports – football, basketball, baseball, ice hockey and rugby – a tradition dating back to the 1940s.

Korea University's mascot and symbol is the tiger and its student-athletes are informally known as "Tigers".

Presidents
The following is a list of presidents of Korea University.

Medical Center

With the opening as Kyoung-sung Women's Medical College in 1938, the university's college of medicine was later renamed and annexed as Seoul Women's Medical College in 1948. Then, in 1967, it was renamed as Woosuk College of Medicine. Finally, the medical school merged with Korea University in 1971, and was officially renamed as Korea University College of Medicine. In 1983, the Korea University Medical Center (KUMC) was formed and its first director was inaugurated. Since then, KUMC has been performing the duties as a university hospital, such as education, research, patient care, and voluntary work in world-disaster areas as well as disadvantaged areas in South Korea. Korea University Medical Center is a comprehensive medical institution that includes three hospitals (Anam, Guro, and Ansan), the College of Medicine, three graduate schools, ten laboratories, and several specialized centers. It also has acquired JCI certification, the second medical center in South Korea to do so.

University Scholarships
Korea University offers scholarships, fellowships and awards under the auspices of the Korea University Foundation, established in 1905. Close to 245 institutional scholarships, totaling more than 11.5 billion won, are available to Korea University students. Almost 90 percent of the admitted international students are awarded Korea University Scholarships. Scholarships are established as either endowed or restricted, in accordance with the wishes of the donor. Scholarships are awarded to students based on criteria such as matriculation status, school and department affiliation, financial need, academic achievement, grade point average and expected graduation date.

Rivalry with Yonsei University

The rivalry between Korea University and Yonsei University, the country's top two private schools, regularly gains national attention. There is an annual fall sports festival between the two universities. Since 1956, the annual Korea–Yonsei University Friendship Games comprises five events every year: Football, Rugby, Baseball, Basketball, and Ice Hockey.

The history of the Yonsei–Korea rivalry: Yeonhee College, the forerunner of Yonsei University, and Boseong College, the forerunner of Korea University participated in the fifth Jeonbok . It was the confrontation between the soccer team of Boseong professional school and the soccer team of Yeonhee professional school in the semi-finals of the eighth Jeonbuk Soccer Contest held in Kyungsung Stadium in 1927.

In 2012, out of the five sports, Korea University won three (baseball, basketball, soccer) and lost two (ice hockey, rugby). In 2014, out of the five sports, Korea University won all of them, the first time ever in history.

Notable People and Alumni

In 2009, Korea University claimed approximately 280,000 living alumni. Among the notable alumni of Korea University are prominent lawyers, physicians, engineers, researchers, Olympic athletes, and others who have gained both national and world fame in their respective fields. Korea University has produced many famous politicians, including the tenth President of the Republic of Korea, Lee Myung Bak, 20th Speaker of the Assembly , Chung Sye-kyun, and the 34th Mayor of Seoul, Oh Se-hoon. Also, a recent survey of South Korea's Fortune 500 companies revealed that Korea University has produced the greatest number of CEOs of these Fortune 500 companies.

Disputes

On November 14, 2019, during 2019–20 Hong Kong protests, a number of local students at Hanyang University and Korea University were attacked and beaten up by international students from China. Posters prepared by the Korean students were also vandalized. The dispute spread to the internet, with some Korean students demanding the implicated international students to return to China.

See also 
Association of Pacific Rim Universities
Education in South Korea
KU-Yonsei rivalry
List of universities in Seoul
List of colleges and universities in South Korea
List of Korea University people
SKY Universities
S3 Asia MBA - Joint MBA program by Fudan University, Korea University and NUS Business School
Universitas 21

References

External Links 
 Korea University 
 Korea University 
 Korea University Library
 Korea University Business School
 Official Site of KU Global Network
 KU Alumni Association
 Association of Pacific Rim Universities
 Medical Center
 Portal
 CDL
 The scholarships blog

 
Universities and colleges in Seoul
Educational institutions established in 1905
1905 establishments in Korea
Private universities and colleges in South Korea
Seongbuk District